Rancho Tía Juana, or Ti Juan was a land grant made to Santiago Arguello on March 4, 1829, by Governor José María de Echeandía.  It covered 26,019.53 acres in what is now Tijuana in the Tijuana Municipality of Baja California, Mexico and parts of San Ysidro and the Tijuana River Valley, San Diego in South San Diego in San Diego County, California.

Background
The property of Rancho Tía Juana was bounded on the south by the 11 league Rancho El Rosario, granted by José María de Echeandía in 1827 to Don José Manuel Machado, one of the first soldiers stationed at the Presidio of San Diego.

The original ranch house was located just south of the Mexican Border near where current border crossing is today.

The name Tijuan derived from the name of a native Kumeyaay settlement in the vicinity.

References

Baja California Ranchos
California ranchos
Ranchos of San Diego County, California
Rancho T
Rancho T
Rancho T
1829 in Mexico
1829 establishments in Alta California
1829 establishments in Mexico